Prinoth may refer to:
 Prinoth (company), a snow groomer manufacturer

People with the surname
 Ernesto Prinoth, Italian racing driver
 Nadia Prinoth, Italian luger